Teodor Peterek (nicknames: Mietlorz and Teo; 7 November 1910, in Świętochłowice – 12 January 1969, in Słupiec), was a Polish soccer player from the interwar period, forward, represented Ruch Chorzów and the Polish national team. He was born on 7 November 1910 in Schwientochlowitz, Germany, since 1920 Świętochłowice, and died on 12 January 1969 in Nowa Ruda.

Life and career
Peterek's career started in Śląsk Świętochłowice in 1925, and two years later moved to Ruch Chorzów for whom he debuted at a very early age. "Teo" was not even 18 years old, when he played in a 1928 game against ŁKS Łódź. The young forward's first game for Chorzów's side was very successful - he scored a goal. He must have liked playing for Ruch (which in the 1930s was by far the best team of Poland, winning championships of the country in the years 1933, 34, 35, 36 and 1938), because "Mietlorz" did not change the side, putting on Ruch's jersey until 1939 and then, for a few times, after the war. In the 1937–38 season, he scored in 16 consecutive league matches, which remained as a world record until broken by Messi in 2013.

World War II
During the Second World War, played in Bismarckhuetter Sport-Verein (1939–1941), which was in fact pre-war Ruch Chorzów, with a German name. In 1942, Theodor (this was the German-language variation of his first name) was conscripted to the Wehrmacht, two years later escaped the German Army and was captured by the Allies, who sent him to Polish units. There, he returned to soccer, representing the Polish Army Soccer Team in 88 friendly games.

After the war
When the war ended, remained in France and in 1947 returned to Chorzów. In 1948 played a few games in Ruch's jersey, then quit soccer and became a coach. Together with Gerard Wodarz and Ernest Willimowski, Peterek was part of Ruch's forward, which is to this day regarded as one of the best forward formations in history of Polish Soccer League. In 189 games for Ruch (1928–1939), he scored 154 goals, a lot of them with the head - this was due to "Teo's" height - at 182 centimeters, he was one of the tallest forwards in Poland. Twice - in 1936 (together with Wilimowski - 18 goals) and in 1938 (21 goals), was the best scorer of the League.

Regarded as a very ambitious, success-oriented player, who would never give up. According to an urban legend, on one occasion Peterek threw some mud in the face of a goalkeeper who had saved his penalty kick.

In Polish National Team played in 12 games and scored 6 goals, debuting on 23 August 1931 in Warsaw, in a match versus Romania (2:3). Participated in 1936 Berlin's Olympic Games, where scored a goal. He played his last game on 18 September 1938 in Chemnitz, versus Germany (1-4, Poland's lone goal was scored by "Teo").

See also
Sport in Poland

References

1910 births
1969 deaths
People from Świętochłowice
Polish footballers
Association football forwards
Śląsk Świętochłowice players
Ruch Chorzów players
Ekstraklasa players
People from the Province of Silesia
Poland international footballers
Olympic footballers of Poland
Footballers at the 1936 Summer Olympics
German Army personnel of World War II
Sportspeople from Silesian Voivodeship